Zeuxippus of Heraclea (fl. 5th century BC) was an ancient Greek teacher of painting in Athens mentioned by Plato.

References

Ancient Greek painters
5th-century BC Greek people
5th-century BC painters